The "National Anthem of the Isle of Man" was written and composed by William Henry Gill (1839–1923), with the Manx translation by John J. Kneen (1873–1939). It is often referred to by its incipit, "O Land of Our Birth".

History
It is sung to an adaptation of the traditional Manx melody of "Mylecharaine’s March", which had been described as the "Manx national melody" long before Gill's composition. The words that originally accompanied the melody date to around 1800 and concern the impoverishment of a father to pay a dowry. However, those curious words have been identified as disparate pieces of older songs amalgamated together incompletely. The first verse of the song is:  (O Mylecharaine, where did you get your store? / Did I not get it in the Curragh, deep, deep enough? / Alone you left me'').

First performed at the Manx Music Festival on 21 March 1907, there are eight verses in total in the modern anthem, but only the first verse is usually sung. The anthem was given official status by the Isle of Man's legislature, Tynwald, on 22 January 2003, with "God Save the King" being designated as the royal anthem. The National Anthem is used on official and ceremonial occasions and in schools; the Royal Anthem is normally reserved for use additionally on those occasions when the Sovereign, members of the Royal Family, or the Lieutenant Governor are present.

The traditional song "" ("Isle of Man") had up to that point vied to be an equal unofficial national anthem, and had been re-popularized by a 1997 Bee Gees recording of it released as a single.

In March 2015, the anthem was mistakenly played instead of the national anthem of El Salvador at a friendly football match between El Salvador and Argentina at FedExField in Landover, Maryland, United States.

Lyrics

Notes

References

Manx music
National symbols of the Isle of Man
Regional songs